Varziad (also Romanized as Varzīad; also known as Varzīat) is a village in Mazu Rural District, Alvar-e Garmsiri District, Andimeshk County, Khuzestan Province, Iran. At the 2006 census, its population was 24, in 7 families.

References 

Populated places in Andimeshk County